The Nigerian state governors 2011–2015 term formally begins in May 2011 for the 26 state Governors in Nigeria elected in April 2011. In the 10 other states, elections were delayed until the current incumbent had served their full term.
Governors are normally elected for a four-year term during the national elections in which the President and members of the upper and lower house are also elected, as are the state legislators. In some cases, the first officeholder may be replaced by another, for example through death, impeachment or if an election is annulled.

April 2011 elections

Elections for 24 of the 36 states in Nigeria were held on 26 April 2011.
In the northern states, elections were held in an atmosphere of violence that followed the election on 16 April 2011 of the southerner Goodluck Jonathan as President.
Elections were delayed until 28 April in Bauchi and Kaduna states due to violence between Christians and Muslims. Turnout in these states was low when the elections were held.

Initial results for 12 states were announced on 28 April 2011, with seven governors being reelected and five governors elected for the first time.
Later that day, results for 22 of the states had been declared, of which the People's Democratic Party (PDP) had taken 15.
The Independent National Electoral Commission (INEC) declared the election in Imo State "inconclusive" due to irregularities in collation of results.
On 29 April the INEC decided to hold supplementary polls in four local government areas and one ward in Imo State on 6 May 2011 to decide the election.

Elections for the 10 remaining states were to be held only when the four-year tenures of the current governors run out. The governors of Adamawa, Anambra, Bayelsa, Cross River, Edo, Ekiti, Kogi, Ondo, Osun and Sokoto states had served less than four years due to taking office only after nullification of the election of former incumbents.

Later changes

Governors
As of 28 May 2011, the breakdown of Governors by party in 36 states was:
 
Following is a list of all Nigerian state governors who held office during the 2011–2015 term. Acting governors are not shown.

See also
Nigerian state governors 2007–2011 term
List of Nigerian state governors
List of state governors of Nigeria

References

 2011